Prabhu Dayal  Balmiki is an Indian politician and a  member of the 16th Legislative Assembly of Uttar Pradesh of India. He represented the Hastinapur constituency of Uttar Pradesh and was a member  of the Samajwadi Party political party.

Early life and  education
Prabhu Dayal  Balmiki was born in Meerut district, Uttar Pradesh. He attended the Navjivan Kisan Inter College and received education till tenth grade. Balmiki belongs to Scheduled Caste community.

Political  career
Prabhu Dayal Balmiki has been a MLA for two terms. He represented the Hastinapur constituency and is a member of the Samajwadi Party political party.

Posts Held

See also
Hastinapur
Sixteenth Legislative Assembly of Uttar Pradesh
Uttar Pradesh Legislative Assembly

References 

1963 births
Living people
People from Meerut district
Samajwadi Party politicians
Uttar Pradesh MLAs 2012–2017
Uttar Pradesh MLAs 2002–2007